Ghulam Murtaza Baloch (4 August 1964 – 2 June 2020) was a Pakistani politician who had been a Member of the Provincial Assembly of Sindh, from September 2016 to June 2020.

Political career
He was elected to the Provincial Assembly of Sindh as a candidate of Pakistan Peoples Party (PPP) from Constituency PS-127 Karachi-XXXIX in by-polls held in September 2016.

He was re-elected to Provincial Assembly of Sindh as a candidate of PPP from Constituency PS-88 (Malir-II) in 2018 Pakistani general election.

On 15 October 2018, he was inducted into the provincial Sindh cabinet of Chief Minister Syed Murad Ali Shah and was appointed Provincial Minister of Sindh for labour and human resources.

Death
On 2 June 2020, he died due to COVID-19 during the COVID-19 pandemic in Pakistan. In May 2020, he had tested positive for SARS-CoV-2.

References

1964 births
2020 deaths
Sindh MPAs 2013–2018
Pakistan People's Party MPAs (Sindh)
Sindh MPAs 2018–2023
Provincial ministers of Sindh
Baloch people
Deaths from the COVID-19 pandemic in Sindh